Anna Rosemond (February 16, 1886 – 1966) was one of the earliest film actresses of the early silent film era.

Biography
Rosemond was born in Philadelphia, Pennsylvania. Her father was an Austrian immigrant, her mother a first generation American of German parentage.

Films
She started her film acting career in 1910, having a supporting role in the film The Actor's Children, starring Frank Hall Crane, as well as an early film version of Uncle Tom's Cabin, which also starred Crane and early child actress Marie Eline. She starred in fifteen films that year, almost all opposite Crane, to include She Stoops to Conquer, and The Two Roses again opposite Marie Eline and again, Frank Hall Crane. Her last film appearance was in the 1911 film Cinderella, starring Florence La Badie and Frank Hall Crane. She was estimated to have appeared in 250 one and two-reel films, mostly produced by Pathe Studios in New York City.

Family
Following her departure from film acting, she married George Jenkins Tompkins of Brooklyn N.Y., a NYC policeman of English/Irish descent. The two left NYC for California in 1913 where they gave birth to one daughter, Irma. When George Jenkins Tompkins died, Anna remarried Daniel Satten, and spent the rest of her life in San Diego, California where she died in 1966 at the age of 80.

References

External links

Anna Rosemund Satten in a San Diego newspaper around 1966

1886 births
1966 deaths
20th-century American actresses
Actresses from Philadelphia
American film actresses
American people of Austrian descent
American people of German descent
American silent film actresses